A system camera or camera body is a camera with interchangeable components that constitutes the core of a system. Early representatives include Leica I Schraubgewinde (1930), Exakta (1936) and the Nikon F (1959). System cameras are often single-lens reflex (SLR) or twin-lens reflex (TLR) but can also be rangefinder cameras or, more recently, mirrorless interchangeable-lens cameras.

Even point-and-shoot cameras usually include a tripod socket. A system camera includes at the very least a camera body and separate, interchangeable lenses, whence the alternative name interchangeable-lens camera (ILC). In addition it often includes:
 Electronic flash units matching the camera's capabilities.
 PC socket or tripod-adapter mounts for external flash units, rather than just a hot shoe
 Mechanical, electric, or IR/RF remote shutter release.
 Extensive supplementary equipment for macro photography and photomicrography.
 Adapters for third-party or legacy lenses, including tilt-shift adapters
 For film cameras, a motor drive to advance the film automatically.
 For film cameras, different camera backs, e.g. large capacity for bulk film, or data back or datebacks for recording exposure and date information.
 Add-on correction or magnifying lenses to help focusing or composition through the viewfinder.
 Interchangeable viewfinders, including interchangeable focusing screens in the case of SLRs. Viewfinders and focusing screens could give different metering options.
 Extra-capacity battery packs, often in the form of a "battery grip" (a second, portrait-oriented handgrip), but also including fully external packs with cable interface
 AC adapters with dummy-battery interfaces for studio or other stationary work
 Sockets and matching cables for direct output, e.g., to a television
 Depth of field preview
 Global navigation satellite system receivers, e.g. (GPS) for geotagging
 Bluetooth or Wi-Fi networking modules

While some early mechanical interfaces are standardized across brands, optical and electronic interfaces are often proprietary. Hot shoes have a common interface for basic flash functions, but often contain proprietary contacts inside for advanced flashes and data modules.

Cameras by type
Technology systems